Abderrahmane Meziani (12 May 1942 – 2 June 2016) was a professional Algerian footballer who played as a forward.

Life and career
Born in Algiers on 12 May 1942, Abderrahmane Meziani began his career at MC Alger in 1955 in the minimal category, he then passed through ASPTT Algiers before landing at the AS Saint-Eugène, Algiers flagship club during the colonial era. After the independence of Algeria in 1962, then aged 20, Meziani signed to USM Alger to spend the rest of his career there.

On 6 January 1963, he was selected for the first time in Team Algeria for a friendly match against the Bulgaria. He scored a goal in the 80th minute and allowed his team to emerge victorious from his first official meeting.

On 1 May 2006 Meziani suffered a cardiovascular event. The left side of his body was paralyzed. After several days in a coma, he was transferred to France in order to receive the necessary care. He recovered slowly after a long rehabilitation. However, it became necessary to always use a wheelchair.

Abderrahmane Meziani died on Thursday 2 June 2016 at 8 am in Algiers after a long fight against illness.

Honours
 Championnat National
 Winner: 1962-63
 Algerian Cup
 Runners–up: 1968-69, 1969-70, 1970-71, 1971-72, 1972-73

International goals

National Team
Scores and results list Algeria's goal tally first. "Score" column indicates the score after the player's goal.

References

1942 births
2016 deaths
Algerian footballers
Algeria international footballers
Ligue 1 players
Footballers from Algiers
USM Alger players
Association football forwards
21st-century Algerian people